Lynn Madsen (born August 8, 1960) is a former American football defensive tackle. He played for the New Jersey Generals from 1984 to 1985, the Houston Oilers in 1986, the Saskatchewan Roughriders in 1987 and for the Ottawa Rough Riders in 1988.

References

1960 births
Living people
American football defensive tackles
Washington Huskies football players
New Jersey Generals players
Houston Oilers players
Saskatchewan Roughriders players
Ottawa Rough Riders players